Hammarby may refer to:

Hammarby, Gävleborg, locality in Sandviken Municipality, Gävleborg County, Sweden 
Hammarby, Stockholm, part of southern Stockholm, Sweden
Hammarby IF, Swedish sports club based in Stockholm, Sweden
Hammarby Sjö, watercourse in Stockholm, Sweden
Hammarby Sjöstad, part of Stockholm Municipality, Sweden
Linnaeus' Hammarby, a botanical garden in Uppsala Municipality, belonging to Uppsala University in Sweden, the former summer home of Carolus Linnaeus

See also
Hammarbya. a genus of orchid